The studio albums in the American Idol compilation series''' are compilations of songs by American Idol contestants normally released every year towards the end of the season or after the season has ended. For the first five seasons, the albums consist of cover songs from all the finalists of the season, and is released as CDs before the last episode by RCA Records. After season 5, such compilations were released only sporadically. Compilations for individual contestants were released digitally starting season 6. No compilations were released in season 7.

Starting season 10, compilation albums are released for sales on iTunes straight after the contestants' performances during the season.  Sales figures are not released during the season for these album so all numbers are for sales after the season is over.

Albums

Season 1

After Idols debut season, the top four finalists (Kelly Clarkson, Justin Guarini, Nikki McKibbin, Tamyra Gray) each recorded a version of the song in the event that they won; but only the winner (Clarkson) released it as a single. The single was included in Clarkson's debut album Thankful.

Season 2
In addition to the compilation album by season 2 contestants, a Christmas album American Idol: The Great Holiday Classics was released later in the year featuring recordings of Christmas songs by contestants from both season 1 and season 2. Both compilation albums were certified gold. 

After season two, the winner (Ruben Studdard) and runner-up (Clay Aiken) each released simultaneously a single containing two songs of one original and one cover. The originals are "This is the Night" (Aiken) and "Flying Without Wings" (Studdard); and the covers are "Bridge Over Troubled Water" (Aiken) and "Superstar" (Studdard)

Season 3

After season three, the winner (Fantasia Barrino) and runner-up (Diana DeGarmo) each released a single containing three songs of which one was a rendition of "I Believe." Barrino's debut album, Free Yourself, included "I Believe" and "Summertime." DeGarmo's debut album, Blue Skies, included "Dreams" and "Don't Cry Out Loud."

Season 4

After season four, the winner (Carrie Underwood) and runner-up (Bo Bice) each released a single for "Inside Your Heaven" and which included one cover song from the show, "Independence Day" (Underwood, also on Showstoppers) and "Vehicle" (Bice). Underwood's debut album Some Hearts also included "Inside Your Heaven" and achieved 7 times Platinum certification.

Season 5

After season 5, winner Taylor Hicks and runner-up Katharine McPhee each released a single with an original song and a cover rendition. The original songs are "Do I Make You Proud" (Hicks) and "My Destiny" (McPhee). The covers are "Takin' It to the Streets" (Hicks) and "Over the Rainbow" (McPhee, renamed to "Somewhere over the Rainbow").

Season 6
For the first time, the compilation album was made available as digital downloads only.  Compilations of individual finalist's performances were also released. On the day after the season six finale, the winner Jordin Sparks and runner-up Blake Lewis released 5-song EPs exclusively to iTunes. Sparks's contained the winner's single, "This Is My Now", as well as four songs she performed on Idol: "I (Who Have Nothing)", "A Broken Wing", "To Love Somebody" and "Wishing on a Star". Lewis's EP did not contain "This Is My Now", but instead all the songs on the EP were songs he performed on the show: "You Give Love a Bad Name", "Time Of The Season", "I Need To Know", "Love Song" and "When The Stars Go Blue".  Compilations for other contestants were released to iTunes later a few weeks later, and it was also possible to download all the recordings this season as a collector's edition.

Both Jordin and Blake also released several other songs as singles. These studio-recorded tunes are available both on iTunes and americanidol.com. For Jordin Sparks, these singles were "If We Hold on Together", "You'll Never Walk Alone", "Rhythm is Gonna Get You", "On a Clear Day", and "Hey Baby". For Blake Lewis, these singles were "You Should Be Dancing", "Mack the Knife", "You Keep Me Hangin' On", "Imagine", and "This Love".

 Season 8 
After season 8, an album was released exclusively to Wal-Mart which contained songs from the show from various top ten finalists. The album included both Kris Allen's and Adam Lambert's version of "No Boundaries". Another Wal-Mart exclusive a 5-track EP was also later released with songs from the Top 4 finalists: Kris Allen and Danny Gokey's Renegade, Allison Iraheta and Adam Lambert's Slow Ride, as well as Adam's Whole Lotta Love, Danny's What Hurts the Most and Kris' Ain't No Sunshine. On iTunes, digital albums of recordings from the two finalists were released.

Season 9

Season 10
In this season compilation albums of studio recordings of all contestants' songs were released digitally on iTunes after the performances every week apart from top 3 and top 2. After the top 2 performances, compilations of 14 selected songs from the season by each of the two finalists were released on iTunes and in other retailers. Special five-song EPs from each of the Top 4 finalist were released for sale in Wal-Mart on June 28, 2011.

Season 11
In this season compilation albums of studio recordings of all contestants' songs were released digitally to iTunes after the performances every week. After the Top 2 performances, compilations of 11 selected songs from the season by each of the two finalists were released. A compilation album by the Top 10 finalists and an EP from each of the Top 5 finalists was released for sale in Wal-Mart on July 3, 2012, and the Phillip Phillips' EP was released to other retailers on July 17, 2012 with one different track.

Season 12
In this season compilation albums of studio recordings of all contestants' songs were released digitally to iTunes after the performances every week.

Other Releases

Individual solo albums
After Idol, several finalists and winners released their own solo albums and singles. For a list of major-label studio albums by Idol recording artists, see American Idol contestants discography.

References

External links
Season 5 album review from Houston Chronicle'' (accessed May 25, 2007).